This is a list of cheeses from Poland. The history of cheesemaking in Poland goes back to 5500 BC, when cheese similar to mozzarella was produced in Neolithic times in Kujawy (north-central Poland).

Poland is the 6th largest cheese producer in the world and has the 18th highest cheese consumption. Marek Kosmulski described over 600 types of Polish cheeses manufactured between 1948 and 2019.

Some Polish cheeses are protected by European Union law as regional products.

Polish cheeses

See also

 List of cheeses
 Polish cuisine
 List of cheesemakers

References

External links
 

Polish cheeses